Trussville City Schools (TCS) is the public school system for Trussville, Alabama, a city east of Birmingham. The Trussville City Schools school district serves approximately 5,000 students and is consistently ranked among the top 10 districts in the state of Alabama. Its standardized test scores in Math, Science, and English Language Arts regularly land among the Top 5 or Top 10 in the state (among 138 school systems). The district also consistently earns high rankings from third-party entities including Niche and School Digger. The mascot is the Husky, and team colors are red, gray, and white.

Board Members 

School board officials are appointed by the Trussville City Council for a set term that can be extended or have their contract altered by a vote of the Board of Education.

Current Members (As of Nov. 2022):

Superintendent - Dr. Frank Costanzo (Interim)

Board President - Mrs. Kathy Brown

Board Vice President - Mrs. Kim DeShazo

Board Member - Mr. Mark Sims

Board Member - Mrs. Sherrye Tolbert

Board Member - Dr. Steve Ward

History 
Trussville schools were part of the Jefferson County School System until 2005. In 2000, a financial crisis forced the county to reduce funding for teachers, and when the city of Trussville was not allowed to offset these reductions with its own funds, it began to explore the possibility of creating a separate system. In 2004, the city council passed a resolution that created the Trussville Board of Education, and in 2005, Trussville City Schools officially separated from the Jefferson County School System.

Suzanne Freeman was the district's first superintendent, serving from the district's inception until 2012. She was succeeded by Dr. Patricia Neill, who resigned in 2022.

On October 31, 2022, Dr. Neill sent her letter of resignation to the school board, ending her tenure as superintendent. Frank Costanzo was named interim superintendent on November 1. Dr. Neill’s contract was originally extended in February 2022 to June 30, 2026, but was reworked by the school board to end on October 31, 2023. This negotiation settled ends for both parties, avoiding potential litigation from Neill and allowing her to receive a year’s pay but having no official position within Trussville City Schools. This was amid a “death notebook” scandal that started in September 2022, which was a situation not properly reported to the Trussville Police Department in September of 2021. 

Even though it was discovered the notebook “scandal” was a misunderstanding with no apparent intent of harm, the protocol to contact police was not followed and was discreetly managed. This was the breaking point for many locals who felt they already received little to no communication from the school system and that their concerns had been ignored by the school board and superintendent for years. Dr. Neill requested a 60-day leave the day of an executive school board session, which she did not attend. This meeting on September 30, 2022 was standing room only with a surplus of local residents, parents, students, teachers, and former teachers, with some voicing disdain for the board, but all who spoke called for the removal of Dr. Neill. It was later discovered Neill (under the name Patricia Ragsdale) was also removed from her superintendent position with Cumberland County Schools in Tennessee, for reasons still unknown in 2007.

In the aftermath of the September 30 meeting, the members of the school board began to make amends. All board members received their own personal emails (the school board prior to this day only had one group email) the same day, one board member even went as far to visit every school in the system that day to check in with administrators. It should be noted, however, that this incident with leadership did not affect the daily operations of Trussville schools and that there hasn’t been any change in status of the highly ranked academics of the school system.

Student profile 
Trussville City Schools serve all students living within Trussville city limits. The student population is 86% white, 10% African-American, 2% Asian-American, 1% Hispanic, and 1% multiracial. Approximately 10% of students qualify for free or reduced price lunch. Less than 1% are English Language Learners (ELL), and about 8% have Individualized Education Programs (IEPs).

Trussville City Schools have a dropout rate that is less than one half of one percent. Approximately 93% of Trussville students meet or exceed state proficiency standards in mathematics, and about 95% meet or exceed standards in reading.

Schools
The Trussville City School District includes five schools: a 7A high school, a large middle school, and three elementary schools.

Hewitt-Trussville High School 

Hewitt-Trussville High School (HTHS) is the only high school in the district and serves all students in grades 9 to 12. It surpassed 1,600 students during the 2021-2022 School Year, and with 97 faculty members, had a student-teacher ratio of approximately 15:1. HTHS athletic teams compete in AHSAA Class 7A Region 3 Athletics as designated by the Alabama High School Athletic Association (AHSAA).

Completed in 2008, the HTHS campus is located on a 127-acre site on Husky Parkway between Trussville Clay Road and Deerfoot Parkway, across I-59 from Hewitt-Trussville Middle School. The school is able to accommodate about 1,600 students, with room to grow to 2,400 students in the future. The school was designed by Davis Architects and encompasses 285,000-square feet. Its design includes white columns and a clock tower, and at a final cost of $70 million, the school was the most expensive high school ever built in Alabama upon its opening in October 2008.

Hewitt-Trussville Middle School 

Hewitt-Trussville Middle School (HTMS) serves all students in grades 6 to 8. Its student enrollment for the 2021-2022 School Year was approximately 1,300 students with nearly 75 faculty and staff members. All three Trussville elementary schools serve as feeder schools for Hewitt-Trussville Middle School.

HTMS was established in 1984 on the former campus of Hewitt-Trussville High School in the Cahaba Homestead Project. In 2008, it moved to its current campus on Trussville Clay Road, across Interstate 59 from the new Hewitt-Trussville High School.

Cahaba Elementary School 
Cahaba Elementary School welcomed its first students for the 2016–2017 school year. It is located on the Mall in the Cahaba Project and occupies the renovated campus of the former Hewitt-Trussville Middle and High Schools. The historic campus was renovated at a cost of approximately $9 million and has the capacity to house up to 500 students.

Magnolia Elementary School 
Magnolia Elementary School was scheduled to open for the 2016–2017 school year, but construction delays pushed its opening back by a month and a half. Magnolia serves most of the students in the southern part of the city.  A new construction with a budget of $14 million, Magnolia is large enough to house up to 400 students.  As of the 2021-2022 School Year, Magnolia Elementary was growing and served a student population of approximately 375.

Paine Elementary School 
Paine Elementary School is situated on U.S. Highway 11 on a tract of land donated by Amerex Corporation founders Ned and Goldie Paine.  It is the largest elementary school in Trussville, with more than 1,300 students.  The sprawling campus features a north and south side, each having its own gymnasium and own cafeteria. Paine previously comprised two distinct schools on the same campus: Paine Primary School, which enrolled grades K-2, and Paine Intermediate School, which enrolled grades 3 to 5. Starting with the 2016–2017 academic year, the two schools were consolidated as one.

References

External links 
 Trussville City Schools Website
 Trussville City Schools on Twitter

School districts in Alabama
Education in Jefferson County, Alabama
2005 establishments in Alabama
School districts established in 2005